Hamid Afaq Qureshi also known as Hamid Afaq Qureshi Al–Taimi–Al–Qureshi, is a historian Shaikh Siddiqi of Arabic, Persian and Urdu descent. He was born in 1945 in Bijnor, Uttar Pradesh, India.

Qureshi studied science at the university level. He joined a scientific organisation in 1965 and retired as a gazetted officer in 2005. During his service, he graduated from Delhi University with an art degree. He received a postgraduate degree in history and political science from the University of Rajasthan, Jaipur. He earned his PhD in history from Lucknow University.

Career
Many of Qureshi's works have been published by New Royal Book Company, Lucknow. They include Iqbal 1873–1938,
The Flickers of an Independent Nawabi: Wazir Ali Khan of Avadh (2 Vols.), The Mughals, The English and the Rulers of Awadh: A Kaleidoscopic Study., 1857: Classics: Volume I: Khandang-i-Ghadar and Naunaga (translations) and many other works.

References

External links

1945 births
People from Bijnor
Living people

People from Bijnor district